Phalonidia rotundiventralis is a species of moth of the family Tortricidae. It is found in Sichuan, China.

The wingspan is about 11 mm. The ground colour of the forewings is pale yellowish white, except the basal one-fifth which is ochreous yellow. The hindwings are pale grey.

Etymology
The species name refers to the ventral margin of the sacculus roundly protruding and is derived from Latin rotundus (meaning round) and ventralis (meaning ventral).

References

Moths described in 2013
Phalonidia